Cascade Surge was an American soccer team based in Salem, Oregon, United States. Founded in 1995, the team played in the USL Premier Development League (PDL), the fourth tier of the American Soccer Pyramid, until 2009, when the franchise folded and the team left the league.

The team played its home games at McCulloch Stadium on the campus of Willamette University, where they played since 2004. The team's colors were blue and white.

History
The team from Salem first joined the old USISL Pro League in 1995 as Oregon Surge one of 20 expansion franchises; placed in the Northwest Division, the team was competitive from the get-go, finishing second in the table behind Hawaii Tsunami with a 14–6 records (ties were settled on penalties). The playoffs also proved to be a successful venture: a 3–2 win over Everett BigFoot led the team to the divisional finals, where they again were defeated by Hawaii Tsunami, but the season indicated a positive future.

The Pro League was realigned in 1996, and the newly-titled Cascade Surge found life more difficult in their sophomore year, finishing a distant sixth in the table behind Everett BigFoot and the San Fernando Valley Golden Eagles with a 7–9 record. Things improved in 1997 as the Pro League renamed itself to the Premier Development Soccer League, and Cascade were more competitive, finishing third in the Northwest behind Spokane Shadow and Yakima Reds, but losing in the playoffs at the first attempt 1–0 to Yakima.

The team continued to experience inconsistency in 1998, as they finished their year fourth behind Spokane Shadow and out of the playoffs, and 1999 was the worst season yet, as Cascade finished rock bottom of the Northwest Division with just 2 wins all year, 17 points adrift of the team above them (Yakima Reds) and an astonishing 54 points behind divisional champions Willamette Valley Firebirds. Things did not get much better with the turn of the millennium, although Surge did avoid a second consecutive wooden spoon by finishing one place ahead of Willamette Valley with a 5–11–2 record.

The 2001 season continued the run of poor performances as the Surge continued to be dominated by their Northwest Division counterparts. They finished outside the playoffs for the fourth consecutive year, in fourth place behind divisional champions Calgary Storm, but they did manage to pick up seven wins on the season. The Surge improved further in 2002, returning to the playoffs after finishing third in the northwest behind Seattle Sounders Select. Against all odds, the Surge made it all the way to the Conference Championship game, but went down 3–2 to the Southern California Seahorses. Signs, however, were positive that Surge's form was finally turning around.

The Cascade's excellent form continued in 2003; somewhat surprisingly, the team was better on the road than they were at home, enjoying a five-game winning streak away from Legion Field in May and June.  This included an impressive 2–0 win over the Calgary Storm Prospects. Despite enduring a 6–0 drubbing from the Spokane Shadow, Cascade won five of their last eight regular season games to finish second in the table behind Spokane.  This was enough to earn them a playoff spot for the second year in a row. Although they lost their first playoff game 2–1 to eventual conference champions Orange County Blue Star, the Surge nevertheless enjoyed a significant turnaround in form.

2004 saw the Cascade finally capture their first divisional title, just overtaking the Spokane Shadow on goal difference.  The Surge won 11 of their 16 regular season games, and posted some impressive results, including a 4–1 thrashing of the Yakima Reds in May, a 5–1 drubbing of Spokane Shadow in early July, and an impressive 5–0 demolition of Abbotsford Rangers on the final day of the regular season which gave them their title. Once again, however, the playoff run was to be frustratingly short, as they lost 2–1 to Fresno Fuego first time out. Glenn Duerr and Ukrainian striker Andriy Budnyy were the top scorers, with 12 goals between them, while Dana McGregor contributed an impressive six assists.

Cascade captured their second divisional title in 2005 with a 12–2–2 record, 8 points clear of their closest rivals, Spokane Shadow, and with the sixth best stats in the country. For the second year in a row were dominant, winning their first eight games in succession, and enjoying a number of comprehensive victories on the season: 4-0 over Nevada Wonders, 5–1 over Abbotsford Rangers and 5–2 over Spokane Shadow. Cascade's superb early season form also saw them quality for their first ever US Open Cup, although they lost first time out 4–2 on penalties to Salinas Valley Samba of the National Premier Soccer League. The team made their second trip to the conference final, but were again frustrated by opponents from southern California, losing 3–0 to Orange County Blue Star. Once again Andriy Budnyy was the top marksman with 11 goals amongst the best in the country, while Matthew Clark and Carlos Calderson were amongst the top assist contributors in the league.

Expansion came to the Northwest in 2006, but no-one could have predicted the astonishing turnaround in form Cascade suffered this year. Having been almost invincible in 2005, they managed just 3 wins all season - 1-0 over new boys Tacoma F.C., 2–0 over BYU Cougars, and 2–1 over Tacoma again. Cascade's defense was atrociously leaky, conceding 4 goals or more on seven different occasions, while up front only midfielder Kenneth Davis was providing any attacking potency - although it is perhaps indicative that, as the team's top scorer, he only registered three goals all season. Inevitably, Cascade finished the season adrift at the bottom of the Northwest, 19 points behind champions Abbotsford Rangers.

The poor form exhibited in 2006 continued in 2007 as the Surge finished the season 7th of seven, a full 30 points behind champions BYU Cougars, again with just three wins. The highlight of the year was a 3–1 win on the road over Spokane Spiders which featured a hat trick by Stefan Ostergren, but once again it was Surge's wilting defence which made them suffer: their worst result of the year came on the final day, when they went down 6–1 to Ogden Outlaws. All this was despite the heroic efforts of Ostergren, who almost single-handedly took on the responsibility for Cascade's scoring activity. His 12 goals made him the fifth highest goal scorer in the country, and made him the lone bright spark in a second dismal season in a row for Surge.

Surge were desperate to recapture the successes of old in 2008, and hoped that new head coach Larry Delamarter would help, but they got off to the worst possible start. Surge lost five of their opening nine games of the season, going down 4–0 at Tacoma Tide, 5–1 at BYU Cougars, and 5–0 at home to Abbotsford Mariners, scoring just four goals in response, and were effectively eliminated from playoff contention by the middle of June. They did not up their first win of the season, 2–1 over Tacoma, until June 21, and although they went on to enjoy subsequent victories - 2-0 over Yakima Reds and a comprehensive 5–1 thrashing of Spokane Spiders on the final day of the season - Cascade never looked to be in contention throughout the year, and continued to be a shadow their former selves. They eventually finished 8th in the Northwest, just one point ahead of last place Spokane; Stefan Ostergren was again the team's single potent striker, with 5 goals, while Chris Andre contributed three assists. Ostergren (University of Akron) went on to play for Brilla FC (PDL), before spending three seasons in Vienna, Austria.

The Surge's final season saw the Surge add on future pros: Te Te Bangura, Juan Chang and Ben Sippola, who helped propel  them on a 7-game unbeaten streak in the middle of the season (5–0–2) and within striking range of the playoffs before a late season collapse left the team one spot short, but with a winning record in their final season of play.

On 13 October 2009, Surge President David Irby announced that the club was withdrawing from PDL competition and folding with immediate effect, stating that "changes in the economy made it harder to keep the team operating.". The team owned by Surge International, a 501 c nonprofit organization (www.surgesoccer.org) would continue designing and implementing soccer projects for ministries around the world, including having a base of operations in Vienna, Austria where former Surge players could go to continue their soccer careers, along with other qualified players.

Players

Final squad
vs Yakima Reds, July 18, 2009

Year-by-year

Honors
 USL PDL Northwest Division Champions 2005
 USL PDL Northwest Division Champions 2004

Head coaches
  Jeff Enquist (1996)
  Dan Birkey (1996)
 David Irby (1997–2001)
 Miguel Camarena (2001–2003)
 Phil Wolf (2004)
  Martin Rennie (2005)  
  Gary McIntosh (2006–2007)
  Larry Delamarter (2008)
  Mike Alfers (2009)

Stadia
 Legion Field; Woodburn, Oregon (2003)
 Stadium at McNary High School; Keizer, Oregon, 1 game (2003)
 McCulloch Stadium; Salem, Oregon (1995–2002, 2004–2009)

Average attendance
Attendance stats are calculated by averaging each team's self-reported home attendances from the historical match archive at https://web.archive.org/web/20100105175057/http://www.uslsoccer.com/history/index_E.html.

 2005: 402
 2006: 409
 2007: 541
 2008: 329
 2009: 388

References

External links
Cascade Surge

Association football clubs established in 1995
Defunct Premier Development League teams
Sports teams in Salem, Oregon
Association football clubs disestablished in 2009
1995 establishments in Oregon
2009 disestablishments in Oregon
Soccer clubs in Oregon
Defunct soccer clubs in Oregon